Association for the Recovery of Historical Memory (abbreviated ARMH in Spanish) is a Spanish organization that collects the oral and written testimonies about the victims of the regime of Francisco Franco and excavates and identifies their bodies that were often dumped in mass graves. 

ARMH may also refer to:
 ARM Holdings, a technology company best known for its processors